Mucilaginibacter ximonensis is a  Gram-negative and non-motile bacterium from the genus of Mucilaginibacter which has been isolated from soil from the Ximo region in Tibet in China.

References

External links
Type strain of Mucilaginibacter ximonensis at BacDive -  the Bacterial Diversity Metadatabase

Sphingobacteriia
Bacteria described in 2009